Paal is a hamlet in the southwest Netherlands. It is a part of the municipality of Hulst, Zeeland, and is located 35 km north of Antwerp, Belgium.

The village was first mentioned in 1847 as Paal (De), and refers to a beacon. From at least 1676 until 1874 there was a ferry to Bergen op Zoom at the location.

Paal used to be a fishing village which specialised in mussels. It was home to 412 people in 1840. In 1979, the dike was enlarged and the old harbour disappeared. In 1980, a marina was built instead.

Paal used to be part of the municipality of Graauw en Langendam. In 2003, it was merged into Hulst.

Gallery

References

Populated places in Zeeland
Hulst